Malamed is a Hebrew surname which translates to teacher in English, a variant of  Melamed; see this page for other variants.

Malamed may refer to:

Lionel Malamed
Stanley Malamed

Hebrew-language surnames
Jewish surnames